Richard Howell (October 25, 1754April 28, 1802) was the third governor of New Jersey from 1794 to 1801.

Early life and military career
Howell was born in Newark in the Colony of Delaware. He was a lawyer and soldier of the early United States Army. He served as captain and later major of the 2nd New Jersey Regiment from 1775 to 1779. Richard was a twin, his twin brother was Lewis Howell. Lewis was a physician for the 2nd New Jersey Regiment and died during the Revolutionary War.

Politics 

At the conclusion of the Revolutionary War, Howell was admitted as an original member of The Society of the Cincinnati in the state of New Jersey.

Richard was offered the role of judge advocate of the army, but turned down the appointment to practice law. He was clerk of the New Jersey Supreme Court from 1778 to June 3, 1793. He succeeded Thomas Henderson as Governor and served until 1801. Replaced as Governor by Joseph Bloomfield, Howell died the following year. He was the grandfather of Varina Howell, the second wife of Confederate President Jefferson Davis.

Death 
Howell died in Trenton, New Jersey on April 28, 1802, and was buried in that city's Friends Burying Ground. Howell Township in Monmouth County is named in his honor.

References

External links
New Jersey State Library biography of Richard Howell
New Jersey Governor Richard Howell, National Governors Association
 The Society of the Cincinnati
 American Revolution Institute
Governor Richard Howell

1754 births
1802 deaths
Governors of New Jersey
New Jersey lawyers
People from Newark, Delaware
Politicians from Trenton, New Jersey
American people of Welsh descent
New Jersey Federalists
Federalist Party state governors of the United States
People of colonial New Jersey
Burials in New Jersey
19th-century American Episcopalians
18th-century American politicians
19th-century American politicians